Puhipi James Rukutai (1877 – 11 January 1940) was a New Zealand rugby union and professional rugby league footballer who played representative rugby league (RL) and coached New Zealand. The Auckland Rugby League's minor premiership, the Rukutai Shield, is named after him.

Early years
Rukutai was born at Kāwhia and affiliated to Ngāti Hikairo. He was educated at St Stephen's School. He started his career playing rugby union and was part of George A. Gillett's Goldfields team that defeated Auckland in 1906. Rukutai was working as a miner at the time.

Playing career
Rukutai played for the City Rovers in the 1910 and 1911 Auckland Rugby League competition and also toured Australia with the New Zealand Māori team. He first made the New Zealand side in 1911, alongside former Union teammate George Gillett. He only played a handful of matches in his first two season with City Rovers because he was away on tours for Auckland, and New Zealand several times.

Rukutai was the first captain of the Manukau Magpies when they entered the Auckland Rugby League competition in 1912. The Manukau senior team disbanded during the 1913 season and he moved back to the City Rovers club were he played until 1919.

During the 1913 season he was thought to have contracted Smallpox and at the time he was the only known patient. He was living in Onehunga and was placed in the hospital at Point Chevalier in the isolation ward. His house in Onehunge was "thoroughly disinfected". It then turned out that he had actually been suffering from a severe case of chicken pox and he recovered well. This was not the end of his health issues in 1913. He fell from a horse on 16 November 1913 and broke his leg just above the right ankle in Mangere. The horse stumbled and fell on to him.

He toured Australia with New Zealand in 1911 and 1912 and his career continued after the War when he again toured Australia in 1919. However, Rukutai played in no Test matches as during this time New Zealand played matches against New South Wales and Queensland.

In 1923 Rukutai requested to resume his playing career in the Mangere first junior team as a means to "coaching in a practical manner" however in the Auckland Rugby League Management Committee meeting on 13 June his request was denied. However the following year he was part of the Mangere United team which was a team made from the Manukau and Mangere teams which had been competing in the 2nd grade.

Coaching career
Rukutai coached New Zealand during their 1921 tour of Australia. He remains New Zealand's youngest ever national coach.

He also coached New Zealand Māori between 1922 and 1937. On August 11, 1937, he coached the New Zealand Māori to an upset 16–5 win over Australia at Carlaw Park.

Later years and death
In 1932 Rukutai served on the Auckland Rugby League board as the Clubs' delegate.

He then served as the first chairman of the New Zealand Māori Rugby League Board when it was formed in 1934.

Rukutai died at his daughter's residence in the Auckland suburb of Onehunga in 1940, aged 62 years.

Legacy
Shortly after his death in 1940, the Auckland Rugby League named their minor premiership the Rukutai Shield.

Rukutai was named one of the New Zealand Rugby League's Legends of League in 2008.

References

1870s births
1940 deaths
Auckland rugby league team players
City Rovers players
Manukau Magpies players
New Zealand Māori rugby league players
New Zealand Māori rugby league team coaches
New Zealand Māori rugby league team players
New Zealand miners
New Zealand national rugby league team coaches
New Zealand national rugby league team players
New Zealand rugby league administrators
New Zealand rugby league coaches
New Zealand rugby league players
New Zealand rugby union players
Ngāti Maniapoto people
Rugby union players from Waikato
Rugby league locks
Rugby league players from Waikato